Jephte Matuba Tanga (born 16 June 2004) is an English professional footballer who plays as a midfielder for Cray Wanderers on loan from EFL League Two club Leyton Orient.

Career
Tanga made his senior debut for Leyton Orient in the EFL Trophy in the 1–0 win at home to Southampton U21 on 14 September 2021, coming on as a second-half substitute for Callum Reilly. He later appeared in the 0–0 draw with Milton Keynes Dons in the same competition, again as a substitute, this time for Tyrese Omotoye. Orient lost the match after a penalty shoot-out.

On 14 January 2022, Leyton Orient confirmed Tanga had gone on loan to Sutton Common Rovers, where he won Rovers' Player of the Month award for February. On his return to Orient, he made his league debut as a late substitute for Adam Thompson in the 2–2 draw at Colchester United.

In June 2022, Tanga signed his first professional contract with Orient, alongside defender Harrison Sodje. On 19 August 2022, Tanga signed for Royston Town on a 28-day loan. In October 2022, Tanga rejoined Sutton Common Rovers on loan. In November 2022, Tanga joined Cray Wanderers on loan.

Statistics

References

External links

2004 births
Living people
English footballers
Footballers from the London Borough of Lambeth
Black British sportspeople
Association football forwards
Leyton Orient F.C. players
Sutton Common Rovers F.C. players
Royston Town F.C. players
Cray Wanderers F.C. players
English Football League players
Isthmian League players